Sébastien Groulx (born 29 October 1974) is a Canadian weightlifter. He competed in the men's lightweight event at the 2000 Summer Olympics.

References

1974 births
Living people
Canadian male weightlifters
Olympic weightlifters of Canada
Weightlifters at the 2000 Summer Olympics
Sportspeople from Quebec
Commonwealth Games medallists in weightlifting
Commonwealth Games gold medallists for Canada
Commonwealth Games silver medallists for Canada
Weightlifters at the 1998 Commonwealth Games
20th-century Canadian people
21st-century Canadian people
Medallists at the 1998 Commonwealth Games